Robin John Millar (born 15 October 1968) is a British Conservative Party politician who has been the Member of Parliament (MP) for Aberconwy since the 2019 general election.

Early life and education 
Robin Millar was born in Bangor in 1968, where his father was chairman of the Conwy Conservative Association. Millar went to Ysgol Friars School, then studied civil engineering at UMIST and later moved to Suffolk to support his wife’s work as an equine veterinary nurse. While living there he worked as a civil engineer in Cambridge, Russia, the Netherlands and the USA. He later set up Millar Consulting helping to transform public services, local government and membership organisations.

Political career 
Millar started his political career in 2003 as a member Forest Heath Council for the All Saints ward in Newmarket. Millar was deputy leader of Forest Heath Council and Mayor of Newmarket in 2003. 

He contested the Arfon constituency at the 2010 general election, finishing in 3rd place with 16.7% of the vote. 

He later became a member for both Suffolk County Council for the Newmarket and Red Lodge seat and West Suffolk District Council for Newmarket North before becoming an MP in 2019.
 
He resigned as a director and trustee of the Conservative Christian Fellowship on his election. 

On 19 May 2021, Robin delivered his maiden speech in the House Of Commons, 518 days after the 2019 general election. 
In May 2021 Millar wrote an essay entitled "A Common Sense Model for Poverty" for inclusion in Common Sense: Conservative Thinking for a Post-Liberal Age published by the Common Sense Group, an informal group of Conservative MPs.

References

External links

Living people
1968 births
UK MPs 2019–present
Conservative Party (UK) MPs for Welsh constituencies
Councillors in Suffolk
Members of Suffolk County Council
Conservative Party (UK) councillors
People educated at Friars School, Bangor